The 2021 Liga 2 season was the 76th edition of the second tier of Federación Peruana de Futbol. The season play started on 19 May 2021 and ended on 15 October 2021.

On August 19, 2021, Cultural Santa Rosa changed its name to Los Chankas.

Competition format
The season was divided into three stages: Fase 1, Fase 2 and the Playoffs.

The Fase 1 and Fase 2 were played under the same format, a single round-robin with the 12 teams playing each other once for a total of 22 games (11 for each stage). Points earned during the Fase 1 did not carry over during the Fase 2, however, points earned in both stages generated a final aggregate table. The winners of the Fase 1 and Fase 2 stages qualified to the playoffs, as long as they were among the top six teams of the aggregate table.

The playoffs were to be contested by the winners of Fase 1 and Fase 2, as well as the top two teams of the aggregate table, which would play two semifinals with the winners playing the final to decide the champion who would be promoted to 2022 Liga 1. If the Fase 1 or Fase 2 winners also ended up in the top two of the aggregate table, they would get a bye to the finals. However, in case a team won both stages of the competition, the playoffs would not be played and that team would be declared as champion.

Teams

Because of the COVID-19 pandemic, the whole tournament was played in four stadiums:

Fase 1

Results

Fase 2

Results

Aggregate table

Title Playoff

Revalidación

Quarterfinals

Semifinals

Final

Promotion playoff

Tied 1–1 on aggregate, Carlos Stein won on penalties and were promoted to Liga 1.

Top goalscorers

See also
 2021 Liga 1
 2021 Copa Bicentenario
 2021 Copa Perú

References

External links
  
Peruvian Segunda División news at Peru.com 
Peruvian Segunda División statistics and news at Dechalaca.com 
Peruvian Segunda División news at SegundaPerú.com 
 RSSSF

2021
2021 in Peruvian football